Paradorn Srichaphan was the defending champion but lost in the first round to John van Lottum.

Mardy Fish won in the final 7–5, 3–6, 7–6(7–4) against Robin Söderling.

Seeds

  Paradorn Srichaphan (first round)
  Sjeng Schalken (first round)
  Nicolás Massú (first round)
  Fernando González (second round)
  Mardy Fish (champion)
  Mariano Zabaleta (first round)
  Wayne Ferreira (first round)
  Jarkko Nieminen (first round)

Draw

Finals

Top half

Bottom half

External links
 Main draw 
 Qualifying draw 

Singles
2003 Stockholm Open